Shchigry is a town in Kursk Oblast, Russia, located between the Shchigra and Lesnaya Plata Rivers,  northeast of Kursk. Population:    18,000 (1974).

History
It has been known to exist since the 17th century as a village called Troitskoye na Shchigrakh. In 1779, it was renamed Shchigry. During World War II, Shchigry was occupied by German troops from 21 November 1941 to 5 February 1943.

Administrative and municipal status
Within the framework of administrative divisions, Shchigry serves as the administrative center of Shchigrovsky District, even though it is not a part of it. As an administrative division, it is incorporated separately as the town of oblast significance of Shchigry—an administrative unit with the status equal to that of the districts. As a municipal division, the town of oblast significance of Shchigry is incorporated as Shchigry Urban Okrug.

References

Notes

Sources

Cities and towns in Kursk Oblast
Shchigrovsky Uyezd